Worland may refer to:
Worland (surname)
Gus Worland: Marathon Man, an Australian reality television series
Worland, Missouri, an unincorporated community in Bates County
Worland, Wyoming, a city in Washakie County
Worland High School, a public high school in Worland
Worland House, a historic building in Worland
Worland Municipal Airport near Worland
Worland Ranch near Worland